The highest-selling albums in Brazil are ranked in the CD - TOP 20 Semanal ABPD, published by the Associação Brasileira dos Produtores de Discos (ABPD). The data are compiled by Nielsen based on each album's physical sales and published weekly since June 2009 by ABPD. In 2009, eleven albums reached the peak of the chart.

Música popular brasileira singer Roberto Carlos' Elas Cantam Roberto Carlos had the longest run among the releases that have reached peak position. The album remained at the top of the charts from its issue date of September 7 to October 19. Other artists who had extended runs on the chart include Michael Jackson—the only international artist that reached the top of the chart in 2009—, Ana Carolina, and Victor & Leo. Padre Fábio de Melo, Raça Negra, and two soundtrack albums also reached the peak position—Rede Globo telenovelas Paraiso and Caminho das Índias soundtracks.

Chart history

See also
 2009 in music

Notes
 The ABPD chart began on June 22, and, for this reason this list doesn't show weeks before that date.
 The ABPD also did not divulge the chart for the first and for the last 2 weeks of December 2009. It also did not divulge for the week of 30 November.

References

Brazil Albums
Pro-Música Brasil
Brazilian record charts